Rowley Regis is a town and former municipal borough in Sandwell in the county of the West Midlands, England. It forms part of the area immediately west of Birmingham known as the Black Country and encompasses the three Sandwell council wards of Blackheath, Cradley Heath and Old Hill, and Rowley. At the 2011 census, the combined population of these wards was 50,257.

History

Rowley was part of the Royal hunting grounds - Regis was added to the name of Rowley in around 1140 to signify it was that part of Rowley belonging to the King. 

Along with the rest of the Black Country, Rowley Regis began to see substantial development in the early to mid-19th century. In 1933, Rowley Regis became a borough, and incorporated the communities of Blackheath, Old Hill, and Cradley Heath. These places were all within the ancient parish of Rowley Regis, which (despite being in the county of Staffordshire) was in the diocese of Worcester. The parish contained the manors of Rowley Regis and Rowley Somery, the latter being part of the barony of Dudley, but the extents of these manors and the relationship between them are not clear. Around the time that Rowley Regis became a borough, housebuilding accelerated in both the public and private sectors.

The present St. Giles Church on Church Road is not the original church in Rowley Regis. The church built in 1840 to succeed the original mediaeval building, was found to be unsafe and condemned in 1900.  The next church, built in 1904, was burned down in 1913, some believing the fire to have been started by Suffragettes or local striking steelworkers; this however is supposition and it was more than probable it was a simple accident, the church at this time using paraffin as a means of lighting and the latter perhaps causing the fire. Its present-day successor was designed by Holland W. Hobbiss and A. S. Dixon, and was built in 1923.

Rowley Regis railway station opened in 1867 in the south of the then village, and remains in use to this day.

The new Rowley Regis grammar school was opened on Hawes Lane in September 1962. Well-known former pupils include Pete Williams (original bass player with Dexys Midnight Runners), and actress Josie Lawrence. From September 1975, when comprehensive schools became universal in the new borough of Sandwell, the grammar school became Rowley Regis Sixth Form College, the last intake of grammar school pupils having been inducted the previous year. The younger pupils were distributed between local comprehensive schools.

In September 2003, it became an annexe of Dudley College, but this arrangement lasted just one year before the buildings fell into disuse. It was demolished three years later, and the site was redeveloped as the new Rowley Learning Campus under Sandwell's Building Schools for the Future programme, comprising St Michael's Church of England High School, Westminster Special School, and Whiteheath Education Centre, which opened in September 2011.

Civic history

Originally in Staffordshire, the Rowley Regis Urban District was formed in 1894 to cover the villages of Rowley, Blackheath, Cradley Heath, and Old Hill. The urban district was incorporated into a municipal borough in 1933. Following the acquisition of borough status, plans were unveiled to build new council offices in the borough to replace the existing offices in Lawrence Lane, Old Hill. A site on the corner of Halesowen Road and Barrs Road was selected, with working commencing in October 1937, and the building being completed in December 1938.

In 1966, the borough of Rowley Regis merged with the boroughs of Oldbury and Smethwick to form the Warley County Borough, and became part of Worcestershire. The merger was unpopular with many residents and derided by some as 'Warley white elephant'. 

Eight years later, in 1974, on the formation of the West Midlands Metropolitan county, Warley merged with West Bromwich to form the Sandwell Metropolitan Borough. It is now right in the core of the West Midlands conurbation.

Following the demise of Rowley Regis as a standalone borough in 1966, the council offices in Barrs Road were retained by Warley council and then by Sandwell council. However, a plan was submitted in July 2012 by Sandwell Leisure Trust to demolish the buildings to make way for an expansion to the neighbouring Haden Hill Leisure Centre, and the development of a new fire station.

The archives for Rowley Regis Borough are held at Sandwell Community History and Archives Service.

Bellend of The Year Statue
In December 2022, a statue was erected in Bell End proclaiming Russian president Vladimir Putin to be "Bellend of The Year" for his role in the 2022 Russian invasion of Ukraine, but by 5 February 2023 it had been removed.

Geography

Rowley Regis is the location of the Rowley Hills, famed for the quarrying of Rowley Rag Stone. The hills form part of the east/west watershed between the rivers Trent and Severn, and contain the highest point in the West Midlands region, Turner's Hill, at 269m above sea level.

Localities (former borough of Rowley Regis)
 Blackheath
 Cradley Heath
 Haden Hill
 Old Hill
 Rowley Village
 Whiteheath

Famous residents

 Josie Lawrence – Actress, was educated at Rowley Regis Grammar School (1970–75).
Scott Liam Malone - professional footballer born 25 March 1991.
 Pete Williams – bass player with Dexys Midnight Runners between 1978 and 1981, was educated at Rowley Regis Grammar School (1971–1976).
 John Haden Badley – centenarian and founder of Bedales School grew up spending time at his family's country home "Foxcote" and visiting his uncle and cousins at Haden Hill.
Carlton Palmer – former footballer who played for the England team as well as clubs including West Bromwich Albion, Sheffield Wednesday and Leeds United.
 George Smith 1805–1874 – executioner (period in office 1849–1872).
 James Woodhouse 1735-1820 - poet, born in Rowley Regis, known as the "cobbler poet".
The poet, W. H. Auden’s ancestors were from Rowley Regis. His great-great-great grandfather, William Auden (1726-1794), owned or leased mines in the area. The poet's grandfather, Rev. John Auden (1831-1876), was born in Rowley Regis.

See also

Regis (place)
List of place names with royal patronage in the United Kingdom

Notes

References

External links

 Sandwell BSF
 Community Forum for Rowley Regis

 
Towns in the West Midlands (county)